Antigod is an EP by Swiss heavy metal band Samael.

Track listing

Personnel
Samael
 Vorph – guitar, vocals, production
 Mak – guitar, production
 Mas – bass, production
 Xy – keyboards, programming, percussion, production

Technical personnel
 Russ Russell – mixing, mastering
 Patrix Pidoux – cover artwork

References

2010 EPs
Samael (band) albums
Nuclear Blast EPs